Mohamed Shaaban (born 25 December 1984 in Egypt), is an Egyptian football attacking midfielder who currently plays for (Egyptian Premier League)  side (El Mokawloon)  as well as the Egyptian national team.

Honours

Club
Zamalek SC
Egyptian Premier League: 2014-15

References

External links

1984 births
Living people
Egyptian footballers
Egypt international footballers
Petrojet SC players
ENPPI SC players
Ittihad El Shorta SC players
Zamalek SC players
Al Mokawloon Al Arab SC players
Egyptian Premier League players
Association football midfielders